NRP Espadarte was the first modern submarine of the Portuguese Navy. The submarine was the basis for the establishment of the 1st Submarine Squadron of the Portuguese Navy. Espadarte was discarded in 1931.

Design and description

The submarine was armed with two torpedo tubes located in the bow for  torpedoes. Four torpedoes were carried. Espadarte had a ship's company of 21 officers and ratings.

Construction and career
The submarine was built at La Spezia Naval Base, Italy from 1910 to 1913. Espadarte was launched on 5 October 1912 and commissioned during the reign of Manuel II. The submersible first entered Lisbon on 5 August 1913. NRP Espadarte gave rise to the 1st squadron of submarines of the Portuguese Navy, which served during World War I. Espadarte was discarded in 1931.

Citations

References
 

Naval ships of Portugal
Submarines of Portugal
1912 ships